Philip II of Hesse-Rheinfels (1541, Marburg – 1583), also called Philip the Younger, was the first Landgrave of Hesse-Rheinfels.

Philip was the third son of Landgrave Philip the Magnanimous and Christine of Saxony (1505–1549). After his father's death in 1567, the Landgraviate of Hesse was divided between the four sons out of the late landgrave's first marriage. Philip the Younger received the portion around the Rheinfels Castle and city of St. Goar on the left bank of the Rhine. The county consisted mainly of the former Lower County of Katzenelnbogen with its four Ämter Rheinfels (with the city of St. Goar and the residence Rheinfels Castle) on the left bank of the Rhine, and Braubach, Reichenberg and Hohenstein on the right bank.

In 1569 Philip married Anna Elisabeth of Palatinate-Simmern, thereby becoming the son-in-law of the Elector Frederick III, one of the leaders of Calvinism.

Philip died on 30 November 1583 on castle Rheinfels. As his marriage had remained childless, his territory fell to his elder brother Wilhelm IV, Landgrave of Hesse-Kassel (or Hesse-Cassel). Philip was buried in St. Goar, where Wilhelm erected an imposing Renaissance monument.

Ancestors

Notes and references

1541 births
1583 deaths
People from Marburg  
Landgraves of Hesse
House of Hesse-Rheinfels